is a city located in Chiba Prefecture, Japan. , the city had an estimated population of  59,174 in 27,160 households and a population density of 700 persons per km².

Geography
Chōshi is located in the northeastern part of Chiba prefecture, about 65 kilometers from the prefectural capital at Chiba and 90 to 100 kilometers from central Tokyo. Cape Inubō, within the city, is the easternmost point in the Kantō region. Chōshi is noted for its dramatic sea coast on the Pacific Ocean. The Tone River runs through the northern part of the city. Takagami Atagoyama (elevation 73.6 meters) is the highest peak.

Neighboring municipalities
Chiba Prefecture
Asahi
Tōnoshō
Ibaraki Prefecture
Kamisu

Climate
Chōshi has a humid subtropical climate (Köppen Cfa) characterized by warm summers and cool winters with light to no snowfall.

Demographics
Per Japanese census data, the population of Chōshi in 2020 is approximately 58,000.

History

Chōshi has been noted as a fishing port since ancient times. The commercial fishing and soy sauce industries were developed in Chōshi by the Tokugawa shogunate during the Edo period (1603 – 1868). Their development continued in the early industrialization of Japan in the Meiji period (1868 – 1912). The town of Chōshi was established wth the creation of the modern municipalities system on April 1, 1889. Noted soy sauce producer Yamasa was incorporated in 1928, and Higeta in 1932. Chōshi was elevated to city status on February 11, 1933.

Chōshi was a center of industrial unrest in the early 20th century; there were numerous strikes and labor disputes at the soy sauce factories, and residents attacked the government offices in 1930 over heavy taxation and unaccounted expenditures by municipal authorities.

Attack on Chōshi during WWII
Chōshi was an important military target during World War II due to its fishing industry and canneries. Before and during the war, Chōshi was Tokyo's main food supplier. The first air raid on Chōshi by USAAF B-29 Superfortress bombers took place on March 10, 1945 causing minor damage. This was followed by the Chōshi Air Raid of July 19, 1945, during which time over 150 B-29s rained bombs on the city, destroying 33.8% of the urban area, killing 1,181 civilians and destroying 5,142 homes. The city was bombed again on August 1, 1945. Emperor Hirohito made an official visit to the ruined city on June 6, 1946, after the surrender of Japan.

Government
Chōshi has a mayor-council form of government with a directly elected mayor and a unicameral city council of 18 members. Chōshi contributes two members to the Chiba Prefectural Assembly. In terms of national politics, the city is part of Chiba 10th district of the lower house of the Diet of Japan.

Economy
Chōshi is known as a center of soy sauce production. Production methods were introduced to Chōshi in 1616 from Settsu Province, and later from Kii Province, both near the Seto Inland Sea. Soy sauce manufacturers Higeta and Yamasa are based in Chōshi. The Port of Kashima in nearby Kashima City, Ibaraki Prefecture, is utilized to import soybeans for use in soy sauce production. The remains of soybeans not used in soy sauce production in Chōshi are returned to Kashima for production into feed for livestock.

The city is home to the Chōshi Fishing Port. Its catches of sardines, bonito, and tuna are the largest in Chiba Prefecture. Wind power is actively being developed off the rugged coast of Chōshi for use in the city and the greater Tokyo Metropolitan Area. Amber is also found in the area.

Education
Chiba Institute of Science
Chōshi has 12 public elementary schools, five public middle schools and one public high school operated by the city government, and two public high schools operated by the Chiba Prefectural Board of Education. The prefecture also operates one special education school for the handicapped.

Transportation

Railway

 JR East –  Sōbu Main Line
  –  – 
 JR East – Narita Line
 -  -  (- )
 Chōshi Electric Railway Company - Choshi Electric Railway Line
  -  -  -  -  -  -  -  -  -

Highways

Local attractions
Chōshi is home to Inubōsaki Lighthouse, completed in 1874 by Scotsman Richard Henry Brunton, as well as numerous historic temples, including Enpuku-ji and Mangan-ji.

Twin towns – sister cities
Chōshi has two sister cities:
 Coos Bay, Oregon, United States
 Legazpi, Albay, Philippines

Notable people from Chōshi

Hideyuki Kikuchi, author
Doppo Kunikida, author
Eiji Okada, actor
Takamiyama Torinosuke, sumo wrestler

References

External links

Official Website 

 
Cities in Chiba Prefecture
Populated coastal places in Japan
Populated places established in 1933
1933 establishments in Japan